Apamea chinensis is a moth of the  family Noctuidae.

Apamea (moth)
Moths described in 1900
Taxa named by John Henry Leech